Ultimate Kho Kho (UKK) is an Indian franchise-based Kho kho league started in 2022. The inaugural season, consisting of 6 teams, took place from 14 August to 4 September 2022, with Odisha Juggernauts winning the season after beating Telugu Yoddhas by the score of 46-45 in the final; it had a viewership of 64 million, 41 million of which came from India, making UKK the third-most viewed non-cricket competition in India after the Pro Kabaddi League and the Indian Super League.

History 
Sony Pictures Network India signed a 5-year deal to broadcast UKK, and will invest  into the league over the 5 years.

An exhibition match was played on July 14, 2022. The player draft for the league was completed later that day, with 143 players chosen.

There are plans to launch a women's version of UKK in a few years' time. Future editions of UKK are planned to expand to eight teams, with venues in multiple cities to be used, and some foreign players to be allowed to participate.

Rules 
UKK rules follow the standard rules of Kho Kho with the following exceptions:

 Only 7 players from the attacking (chasing) team are on the field.
 The playing field is only 22 meters long and 16 meters wide.
 2 points are scored for a regular tag, and 3 points are scored if a tag is made while an attacker is either fully outstretched and diving ("Sky Dive") or touching a pole ("Pole Dive").
 The defending team scores two bonus points if any batch of 3 defenders can avoid being eliminated for two and a half minutes, and two additional points for every 30 seconds afterward.
 One attacking player (known as the "Wazir") may run in any direction when acting as the active attacker. 
 The attacking team can take a powerplay in each of their attacking turns during which they have two Wazirs. Each powerplay lasts until all 3 defenders of the current batch are out.
 Each team's turn to score/defend lasts 7 minutes.
 Tiebreaker (named "Minimum Chase"): Each team gets one additional turn to score, and the team that scores its first point the fastest wins.

Teams 

The six teams are named Chennai Quick Guns, Gujarat Giants, Mumbai Khiladis, Odisha Juggernauts, Rajasthan Warriors, and Telugu Yoddhas.

Tournament seasons and results

Titles won by each team

UKK season results

Teams' performances

League stage positions

Awards

See also 
 Sport in India
 Pro Kabaddi League
 World Chase Tag

References 

Kho-Kho
Sport in India
Professional sports leagues in India